Lindsay Jones may refer to:

 Lindsay Jones (actor), known for their work at Rooster Teeth Productions
 Lindsay Jones (composer), known for his work in film, theatre, and television
 Lindsay Jones (curler), see List of teams on the 2011–12 World Curling Tour
 Lindsay Jones (soccer), see New York Power